Banc-y-môr is a small village in the  community of Trawsgoed, Ceredigion, Wales, which is 69.4 miles (111.6 km) from Cardiff and 173.5 miles (279.1 km) from London. Banc-y-môr is represented in the Senedd by Elin Jones (Plaid Cymru) and is part of the Ceredigion constituency in the House of Commons.

References

See also
List of localities in Wales by population

Villages in Ceredigion